Figure It Out is an American children's game show that aired on Nickelodeon.

Figure It Out may also refer to:

Figure It Out (board game), a board game based on the TV show
"Figure It Out" (Lil' Chris song), 2007
"Figure It Out" (Serj Tankian song), 2012
"Figure It Out" (Royal Blood song), 2014
"Figure It Out" (French Montana song), 2016
"Figure It Out", a song by VersaEmerge from Fixed at Zero
"Figure It Out", a song by Chaos Chaos from Chaos Chaos
"Figure It Out", a song by Maroon 5 from It Won't Be Soon Before Long
Figure It Out, an EP, or the title song, by Jai Waetford, 2019